Karnataka Soaps and Detergents Limited (KSDL) is an Indian company, owned by the Government of Karnataka, that manufacturers personal care products including Mysore Sandal Soap. It was founded as Government Sandalwood Oil Factory in 1916 by Maharaja Krishna Raja Wadiyar IV and M. Visvesvaraya for extracting and exporting sandalwood oil. It launched Mysore Sandal Soap in 1918, and has since manufactured soaps and cosmetics products. The company became a public sector enterprise in 1980 and was renamed as KSDL.

KSDL obtained the Geographical Indication tag for Mysore Sandal Soap and Mysore Sandalwood Oil in 2006. Apart from soaps and sandalwood oil, KSDL manufactures detergents, fragrances, talcum powder, hand washes, face washes, coconut oil and agarbathis. It has manufacturing facilities in Bangalore, Mysore and Shimoga, and exports its products to 11 countries as of 2019.

References

Manufacturing companies of India
Cosmetics companies of India
Companies based in Bangalore
Economy of Karnataka 
Kingdom of Mysore
Indian companies established in 1916
Manufacturing companies established in 1916